A bizcocho can refer to a cake, a buttery flaky pastry or a cookie.

Bizcocho may also refer to:

Food 
 Biskotso, Filipino twice-baked bread or cookies
 Biscotti, twice-baked cookie
 Bizcochito, dry cookie flavored with anise, typical of New Mexico

People 
 Francisco Bizcocho (born 1951), Spanish footballer
 Otilio Warrington (born 1944), Puerto Rican actor, popularly known as Bizcocho